The 2008 Gastein Ladies was a women's tennis tournament played on outdoor clay courts. It was the 2nd edition of the Gastein Ladies, and was part of the Tier III Series of the 2008 WTA Tour. It took place in Bad Gastein, Austria, from July 14 through July 20, 2008. Fourth-seeded Pauline Parmentier won the singles title.

Finals

Singles

 Pauline Parmentier defeated  Lucie Hradecká 6–4, 6–4
 It was Pauline Parmentier's 1st title of the year, and her 2nd overall.

Doubles

 Andrea Hlaváčková /  Lucie Hradecká defeated  Sesil Karatantcheva /  Nataša Zorić 6–3, 6–3

External links
 Official website
 ITF tournament edition details

Gastein Ladies
2008
2008 in Austrian women's sport
July 2008 sports events in Europe
2008 in Austrian tennis